The following lists events that happened during 1935 in Southern Rhodesia.

Incumbents
 Prime Minister: Godfrey Huggins

Events
 Rhodesian Air Force established under the name Southern Rhodesia Staff Corps Air Unit

Births
 September 3 - Dorothy Masuka, jazz singer
 October 2 - Edson Zvobgo, politician (dies 2004)
 Christopher Chetsanga, scientist

Deaths

References

 
Years of the 20th century in Southern Rhodesia
Southern Rhodesia
Southern Rhodesia
1930s in Southern Rhodesia